North Florida is a region of the U.S. state of Florida

North Florida may also refer to:
University of North Florida in Jacksonville, Florida
North Florida Ospreys, that university's athletics program
North Florida Community College in Madison, Florida